In mathematics, tightness is a concept in measure theory. The intuitive idea is that a given collection of measures does not "escape to infinity".

Definitions

Let  be a Hausdorff space, and let  be a σ-algebra on  that contains the topology . The collection  is called tight (or sometimes uniformly tight) if, for any , there is a compact subset  of  such that, for all measures ,

Very often, the measures in question are probability measures, so the last part can be written as

If a tight collection  consists of a single measure , then (depending upon the author)  may either be said to be a tight measure or to be an inner regular measure.

Examples

Compact spaces

This is not necessarily so for non-metrisable compact spaces. If we take  with its order topology, then there exists a measure  on it that is not inner regular. Therefore, the singleton  is not tight.

Polish spaces

it is precompact in the topology of weak convergence.

A collection of point masses

Consider the real line  with its usual Borel topology. The collection

On the other hand, the collection

A collection of Gaussian measures

Consider -dimensional Euclidean space  with its usual Borel topology and σ-algebra. Consider a collection of Gaussian measures

where the measure  has expected value (mean)  and covariance matrix .

Tightness and convergence

Tightness is often a necessary criterion for proving the weak convergence of a sequence of probability measures, especially when the measure space has infinite dimension. See

 Finite-dimensional distribution
 Prokhorov's theorem
 Lévy–Prokhorov metric
 Weak convergence of measures
 Tightness in classical Wiener space
 Tightness in Skorokhod space

Exponential tightness

A strengthening of tightness is the concept of exponential tightness, which has applications in large deviations theory. A family of probability measures  on a Hausdorff topological space  is said to be exponentially tight if, for any , there is a compact subset  of  such that

References

 
 
   (See chapter 2)

Measure theory
Measures (measure theory)